The ancient Sri Lankan people, which consisted of Sinhalese and Sri Lankan Tamils excelled in the construction of tanks (Wevas) or reservoirs, dagobas (or stupas), Hindu temples and palaces in Sri Lanka, as evident from the ruins which displays a rich variety of architectural forms.

Irrigation works

 

Major irrigation schemes of Sri Lanka, as evident from the earliest written records in the Mahawansa, date back to the fourth century BCE (Parker, 1881; Brohier, 1934).  The purpose and determination in the construction of the irrigation systems are depicted by the words of Parakrama Bahu I, 1153–1186 CE: "Let not even a drop of rain water go to the sea without benefiting man". 

The Sri Lankan chronicle, the Culavamsa which was written in the Buddhist canonical language Pali, enumerates his works both as a provincial ruler in western Sri Lanka and later as the monarch of the whole country: he either built or restored 163 major tanks (reservoirs), 2,617 minor tanks, 3,910 irrigation channels, 328 stone sluices and 168 sluice blocks, besides repairing 1,969 breaches in embankments. Among the reservoirs he built was the tank at Polonnaruwa, called on account of its size the Parakrama Samudra (translation: Sea of Parakrama).

The final achievements were highlighted by Sir Henry Ward, Governor of Ceylon:

Reservoirs
A wealth of river basin-based water heritage is abundant in Sri Lanka. Reservoirs of Sri Lanka are different from the water tanks seen in ancient civilisations or bodies of water collected for purposes such as generation of electricity or supplying water for consumption.   

Tanks are locally termed Weva (plural: Wew).
 
 Viji Wewa
 Ridiyagama
 Badagiriya
 Muruthawela
 Hurulu weva
 Abhayavapi tank
 Mamaduwa Wewa
 Angamuwa Wewa
 Bandagiriya Wewa
 Basawakkulama Wewa (Abaya Wewa)
 Bathalagoda Wewa
 Debara Wewa
 Erupothana Wewa
 Giritale Wewa
 Iratperiyakulama Wewa
 Kala Wewa
 Kande Ela Reservoir
 Kandy Lake (Nuwara Weva)
 Kantale Wewa
 Kaudulla Wewa
 Kondawattuwana Wewa
 Lunugamwehera
 Mahagala Wewa
 Mahakanadarawa Wewa
 Mahavilachchiya Wewa
 Minneriya Tank
 Mutukelina Wewa
 Nachchaduwa wewa
 Nuwara Wewa (Anuradhapura}
 Padaviya Wewa
 Panda Wewa
 Parakrama Samudraya or Sea of Parakrama
 Pavakkulama Wewa
 Sorabora Wewa
 Tabbowa Wewa
 Thuruwila Wewa
 Tissa Wewa (Anuradhapura)
 Tissa Wewa (Tissamaharama)
 Urusita Wewa
 Siyambalangamuwa Wewa
 Vavunikulama Wewa
 Weerawila Wewa
 Wilpita Wewa / Lenabatuwa Wewa
 Yoda Wewa (Mannar)
 Yoda Wewa (Tissamaharama)
 Kuda Vilachchiya Wewa

Stupas of ancient Sri Lanka

The dagobas, or stupas, are distinctive for many reasons. They are probably the largest brick structures known to the pre-modern world. Jetavanaramaya is the largest stupa constructed in any part of the world. The deepest-known foundation of the ancient world. Jetavana was the third-tallest building in the ancient world. Abhayagiri ranked fifth and Ruwanwelisaya came seventh. The first, fourth and sixth places were held by the pyramids. 

 Ruwanwelisaya
 Thuparamaya
 Ridi Vihara
 Lovamahapaya
 Abhayagiri Dagaba
 Jetavanarama
 Mirisaveti Stupa
 Lankarama
 Isurumuniya
 Rathna Prasadaya
 Dakkhina Stupa
 Sela Cetiya
 Naka Vihara
 Kiribath Vehera
 Pubbarama
 Tapovana

Hindu Temples of ancient Sri Lanka

The Pancha Ishwarams (five abodes of Shiva) are five coastal ancient kovils (temples) built in dedication to the Hindu supreme being Ishwara in the form of the god Shiva, located along the circumference of Sri Lanka. 

These complexes were highly praised by scholars and historians since the antiquity. The most impressive of these five magnificent and decorated temple complexes was the Tenavaram temple. Built on vaulted arches on the promontory overlooking the Indian Ocean. The central gopuram tower of the vimana and the other gopura towers that dominated the town were covered with plates of gilded brass, gold and copper on their roofs. Its outer body featured intricately carved domes, with elaborate arches and gates opening to various verandas and shrines of the complex, giving Tenavaram the appearance of a golden city to sailors who visited the port to trade and relied on its light reflecting gopura roofs for navigational purposes.

The Moroccan traveller Ibn Battuta visited the temple in the 14th century and described the deity Dinawar as sharing the same name as  the flourishing trade town in which He resided, made of gold and the size of a man with two large rubies as eyes "that lit up like lanterns during the night." One thousand Hindus and Yogis were attached to this vast temple for services, with five hundred girls that danced and sang in front of the Mahavishnu idol.
Naguleswaram
Ketheeswaram
Koneswaram
Munneswaram
Tondeswaram

Cave Temples of ancient Sri Lanka

Cave temples had been used in Sri Lanka since ancient times, fine examples if these include the magnificent cave temple complex in Dambulla built by king Valagamba. Cave temples has preserved some of the best examples of Sinhalese art and Sinhalese architecture. In the years gone by of monarchy rule in ancient Sri Lanka the rock cave shelters cloistered in the recess of the forests served the recluse Buddhist monks in performing their meditation chores and other religious observances. Such cave hermitages were patronised by the ruling kings of the time, chieftains and the people as well. As the years passed, such cave shelters turned into len viharas (cave temples) and len avasas (abodes of Buddhist monks). Such len (cave shelters), were donated by kings, queens and other royalty and nobility. Foremost among such noble chieftains were the paramukas (chieftain of royal rank holding multiple designations).

 Vessagiri
 Dambulla Rock Temple
 Pilikuththuwa Raja Maha Vihara
 Aluvihara Rock Cave Temple
 Dimbulagala Raja Maha Vihara
 Bogoda and Dowa cave temples
 Kinihiri Kanda Temple

Palaces of ancient Sri Lanka

 Queen's Palace
 Sigiriya built in the 5th century CE was a combination of natural and man made fortress built around a  rock on which was the royal Sky Palace. It is world-renowned for the beautiful Sigiriya frescoes.

Landscaping in ancient Sri Lanka

 Magul Uyana
 Mahameghavana Garden
 Ranmasu Uyana

Royal Baths of ancient Sri Lanka

Kuttam Pokuna

Sculpture in ancient Sri Lanka

 Samadhi Statue
 Toluwila Statue
 Avukana Buddha Statue
 Buduruwagala Statue
 Rasvehera Statue
 Maligawila Buddha statue

References

External links
Wikimapia – Reservoirs of Sri Lanka
Salient features of the traditional human-made eco-agriculture landscape in Sri Lanka

Archaeological sites in Sri Lanka
History of Buddhism in Sri Lanka